Alexeyevka is a rural locality (a selo) and the administrative center of Alexeyevsky Selsoviet of Bureysky District, Amur Oblast, Russia. The population was 215 as of 2018. There are 7 streets.

Geography 
Alexeyevka is located 65 km southwest of Novobureysky (the district's administrative centre) by road. Astashikha is the nearest rural locality.

References 

Rural localities in Bureysky District